Busoga sub-region is found in Eastern Uganda occupying an area of over 10,000 square kilometers and according to the 2014 national census about 40 percent of the people in the eastern region live in this sub-region. Busoga consists of the following districts:

 Bugiri District
 Bugweri District
 Buyende District
 Iganga District
 Jinja District
 Kaliro District
 Kamuli District
 Luuka District
 Mayuge District
 Namayingo District
 Namutumba District

The area covered by the above districts constitutes the traditional Busoga Kingdom. Milton Obote abolished the traditional kingdoms in Uganda in 1967. When Yoweri Museveni re-established them in 1993, Busoga re-constituted itself.

The sub-region is home mainly to the Basoga ethnic group. The people of Busoga are called Basoga (singular: Musoga). The Basoga speak Lusoga, a Bantu language. Lusoga is similar to Luganda, spoken by the people of the neighboring Buganda Region, which is also referred to as Central Uganda.

See also
 Regions of Uganda
 Districts of Uganda

References

Sub-regions of Uganda
Eastern Region, Uganda